Kariganur, also known as Karignuris a village in Channagiri Taluk, Davangere District, Karnataka, India. Kariganur is well known for farming and for giving birth to one of the most famous humorous and witty thinkers, the former chief minister of Karnataka late J. H. Patel.

There are number of other villages near Kariganur, like hadadi, kukkawada, thyavanige etc...

Kaleswara guddi is in Kariganur, which is temple of Shiva and every year mostly in the month of April there will be rathotsava, which is like Bangalore Karga, Usually many people gather for this rathotsava.

External links
J H Patel
Davangere e-gov site

Villages in Davanagere district